Ras͟hḥ-i-ʻAmá ("The Clouds of the Realms Above" or "Sprinkling of the Cloud of Unknowing") is the first known tablet written by Baháʼu'lláh, founder of the Baháʼí Faith, in 1852. It is also the only known tablet of Baháʼu'lláh written in Qajar dynasty Persia. It is a poem of 20 couplets in Persian, written when Baháʼu'lláh was imprisoned  in the Síyáh-Chál in Tehran, after he received a vision of a Maid of Heaven, through whom he received his mission as a Messenger of God and as the One whose coming the Báb had prophesied.

In February 2019 an authorized translation was published by the Baháʼí World Centre in the collection The Call of the Divine Beloved.

Notes

Further reading
 Cole, Juan. "Baha'u'llah and the Naqshbandi Sufis in Iraq, 1854-1856", from Iran East and West: Studies in Babi and Baha'i History, vol. 2 (edited, with Moojan Momen, and contributor); Los Angeles: Kalimat Press, 1984, pp. 10–12.
 Savi, Julio (2012). Baháʼu'lláh's Persian Poems Written before 1863 in: Lights of Irfan, volume 13. Wilmette, IL. pp. 317–361.
Sharon, Moshe. The Early Writings of Baháʼulláh - Clouds and the hiding God:  on the origins of some terms.

External links
 The Utterance Project: Recitation of the Rashḥ-i-ʻAmá with English subtitles
 Related documents on Baháʼí Library Online
Rashḥ-i-ʻAmá – a compendium

Works by Baháʼu'lláh
1852 in religion